Gölyazı is a Turkish town founded on a small peninsula  on  Lake Uluabat.

Gölyazı was founded by the Ancient Greeks. but remains of the Roman period are abundant.

Every year the town holds the Stork Festival and until the 20th century, Greeks and Manavlar lived together. In ancient times it was known as Apolloniatis The name Gölyazı  means Fisherwoman.
The place has been also known as  Apolyont, Apolloniatai or Apolloniada.

History

Possibly founded as a colony by Miletus, the antiquity of the city is supported by coins from as early as 450 BCE, which bear the anchor symbol of Apollo and which have been attributed by some scholars to this Apollonia. The city experienced prosperity under the Attalids during Hellenistic times.

The Roman Emperor Hadrian visited the city and in the Byzantine period, it belonged to the Diocese of Bithinya, then Nicomedia. 
During the Byzantine period, it was called Theotokia.

In 1302 the Ottoman king Osman I took refuge in the castle after the Battle of Bapheus  but retreated.

The city had a sizeable Greek population before 1922 and the Greco-Turkish War (1919–1922). 
Following the episodes of the war the retreat of the Greek army Greek families abandoned the place to Greece
and reallocated in many different places
.

The name of the town was changed to Gölyazı during the Turkish Republic period (for more info see Place name changes in Turkey).

Manavlar
Manavlar or Manav Turks (Greengrocers); are Hanafi Sunni Turkish people living in northwest Anatolia, especially in Manavgat, Sakarya, Bilecik, Balıkesir, Bursa, Çanakkale, Kocaeli, Eskişehir, Bolu and Düzce provinces. Manavlar are based on various Turkish peoples such as Uyghur, Karluk, Çiğil, Halaç, Kazakh, and Kyrgyz who settled in the Seljuk period in Anatolia and came from Central Asia.

Ruins
The ruins of Gölyazı are, 3.7 kilometers south of the highway. Some remains include: 
An ancient Roman highway.
A sarcophagus and cover cut from the natural rock at the edge of the ancient road, in a mausoleum in 8.5 x 8.5 meters in size.  
The so-called "Stone Gate" at the narrowest part of the peninsula and city wall with thickness of 5 meters in some places.

References

Towns in Turkey
Ancient Greek archaeological sites in Turkey
Mysia